Breazova may refer to several places in Romania:

 Breazova, a village in Sarmizegetusa Commune, Hunedoara County
 Breazova, a village in Margina Commune, Timiș County
 Breazova, a tributary of the Bârzava in Caraș-Severin County
 Breazova (Râul Galben), a river in Hunedoara County

See also 
 Breaza (disambiguation)